Elöd Gergely Antal (born March 11, 1955 in Sâncrăieni, Romania) is a retired Romanian ice hockey player. He played for the Romanian team at the 1976 and 1980 Winter Olympics.

Sources

 

1955 births
Living people
Ice hockey players at the 1976 Winter Olympics
Ice hockey players at the 1980 Winter Olympics
Olympic ice hockey players of Romania
People from Harghita County
Romanian sportspeople of Hungarian descent